Legislative Assembly elections were held in the Indian state of West Bengal in 1982. The Left Front, which had won the 1977 West Bengal Legislative Assembly election, emerged victoriously. The Indian National Congress emerged as the main opposition party in the state, as the Janata Party was disintegrating.

Background
On 6 January 1982 the West Bengal government requested that assembly elections be held on 15 March 1982, due to the approaching Monsoon season starting in April. However, in the end the election was held in May 1982, parallel to state assembly elections in Kerala, Himachal Pradesh and Haryana.

Left Front
Ahead of the 1982 assembly elections, the Left Front had gained three new members; the Communist Party of India (CPI), the West Bengal Socialist Party (WBSP) and the Democratic Socialist Party (DSP). Some of the older, smaller Left Front constituents were uncomfortable with the expansion of the alliance, claiming that CPI(M) was diluting it politically. There were also disagreements on distribution of ministerial portfolios after the expansion of the alliance.

Congress (I)-Congress (S) alliance
As of the early 1980s the Congress(I) was heavily divided in West Bengal. Divisions existed in each of the appointed ad hoc district committees across the state.

In 1978 Sharad Pawar named former West Bengal Congress leader Priya Ranjan Dasmunsi as president of the West Bengal Pradesh Congress Committee (Socialist). However Congress(I) and Congress(S) contested the 1982 in alliance. The IC(S) performed poorly in the 1982 assembly elections and a merger of the West Bengal units of the (S) and Congress(I) took place soon after the 1982 polls.

Congress(I) emerged as the largest opposition party in the election. Most of the seats previously held by the Janata Party were won by Congress(I). With the Janata Party eradicated from the assembly, West Bengal politics became polarized between the Left Front and Congress(I) for many years to come.

Bharatiya Janata Party
The Bharatiya Janata Party contested the West Bengal assembly election for the first time in 1982. The primary objective of the party was to create a nucleus for a future third force in West Bengal politics. The party supported the call of the West Bengal government to hold the elections in March 1982.

Gorkhaland agitation
In the wake of the 1980 Gorkhaland movement, a poll boycott campaign took place in the Darjeeling hills with the slogan "No State, No Vote". Organizations calling for a poll boycott included the Pranta Parishad and the Gorkha National Liberation Front of Subhash Ghisingh. Voter participation in Darjeeling stood at 59.40%, compared to the statewide 76.96%. CPI(M) emerged as the sole party of relevance in the hills to oppose a separate Gorkhaland state. CPI(M) won three out of the four assembly seats in the Nepali-dominated areas, the fourth going to an All India Gorkha League candidate (contesting as an independent).

Results
The Left Front emerged victorious, winning 238 out of 294 seats in the election. The combined Left Front vote was 11,869,003 votes (52.7% of the votes cast in the state).

According to an unnamed Western diplomat, quoted in India Today in regards to the polls, "Bengali democracy has come really close to the East European variant of the 'people's democracy' where nobody expects an upsetting victory or defeat". Nevertheless, whilst the overall outcome was a landslide victory for the Left Front, the left also suffered a number of set-backs. Six incumbent Left Front ministers were defeated in their respective constituencies. The CPI(M) Information Minister Buddhadev Bhattacharya lost the Cossipur seat to Congress(I) candidate Prafulla Kanti Ghosh by 728 votes. The CPI(M) Education Minister Partha De, noted for his policy of removing English language from the primary school curriculum, lost the Bankura seat. The incumbent Food Minister, the Revolutionary Communist Party of India leader Sudhindranath Kumar, lost his seat Howrah Central. Finance Minister and CPI(M) heavy-weight Ashok Mitra lost the Rash Behari Avenue seat to Congress(I) candidate Haimi Bose. As Finance Minister Mitra had cracked down on the Sanchaita Savings Company, whose 'get-rich-quick' scheme had some 4,000 depositors in his constituency.

In Calcutta Congress(I) managed to win 11 out of 22 seats. Santosh Rana of the Provisional Central Committee, Communist Party of India (Marxist-Leninist) lost his Gopiballavpur seat to CPI(M).

The ninth West Bengal Legislative Assembly was constituted on 24 May 1982. CPI(M) leader Jyoti Basu remained as Chief Minister, being sworn in for a second term. Hasim Abdul Halim of CPI(M) became speaker of the Legislative Assembly, a post he would hold until 2011.

Elected members

References

State Assembly elections in West Bengal
1980s in West Bengal
West Bengal